Bringolf is a surname. Notable people with the surname include:

Aurel Bringolf (born 1987), Swiss handball player
Hans Ormund Bringolf (1876–1951), Swiss adventurer and autobiographer
Walther Bringolf (1895–1981), Swiss politician